Mellekh (Nepali: मेल्लेख ) is a Gaupalika(Nepali: गाउपालिका ; gaupalika) in Achham District in the Sudurpashchim Province of far-western Nepal. 
Mellekh has a population of 24670. The land area is 134.78 km2.

References

Rural municipalities in Achham District
Rural municipalities of Nepal established in 2017